Thunderstone is the debut album by Finnish power metal band Thunderstone.  Some versions of this album contain a bonus track which is a cover of the song "Wasted Years" by Iron Maiden.

Track listing
All songs written by Nino Laurenne, except where noted.
"Let the Demons Free"  – 3:59
"Virus" (Laurenne, Kari Tornack) – 4:49
"World's Cry"  – 4:20
"Me, My Enemy"  – 3:41
"Will to Power" (Laurenne, Tornack) – 8:33
"Weak" (Laurenne, Tornack) – 3:10
"Eyes of a Stranger" (Laurenne, Tornack, Mirka Rantanen) – 5:23
"Like Father, Like Son"  – 5:35
"Voice in a Dream"  – 4:39
"Spread My Wings" (Laurenne, Chuckii Booker) – 5:17
"Diamonds And Rust" (Joan Baez Cover) (Japanese Bonus Track) - 3:25
"Wasted Years" (Iron Maiden Cover) (Limited Edition Bonus Track) - 5:30

Personnel
Pasi Rantanen - lead vocals
Nino Laurenne- guitar, backing vocal
Titus Hjelm - bass, backing vocal
Mirka "Leka" Rantanen - drums
Kari Tornack - keyboards

References

2002 albums
Thunderstone (band) albums

it:The Burning (Thunderstone)
fi:The Burning